The Show Chart is a music program record chart on SBS M that gives an award to the best-performing single of the week in South Korea. 

In 2022, 24 singles achieved number one on the chart, and 22 acts were awarded first-place trophies. "Dilemma" by Apink had the highest score of the year, with 9,700 points on the February 22 broadcast.

Chart history

References 

2022 in South Korean music
2022 record charts
Lists of number-one songs in South Korea